Dorothy Ann Eckels Bailie (born 1935) is an American mathematician who worked at Goddard Space Flight Center in the 1950s and 1960s. She was one of the three authors of the 1959 report establishing Earth's shape as asymmetrical and "pear-shaped", based on data from Vanguard 1.

Early life 
Dorothy Ann Eckels was born in Littleton, New Hampshire and raised in Laconia, New Hampshire, the daughter of John C. Eckels and Dorothy R. Eckels. Her father was a surgeon. Her maternal grandfather, Adolph Frederick Erdmann, was a pioneer in the field of anesthesiology. She earned a bachelor's degree in mathematics at Middlebury College in 1957. While at Middlebury, she was elected Queen of the school's Winter Carnival, an event she co-chaired.

Career 
Bailie worked at the United States Naval Research Laboratory after college. By 1959 she worked in the Theoretical Division of NASA's Goddard Space Flight Center, on calculating and analyzing complex orbits for satellites. She, R. Kenneth Squires, and John A. O'Keefe were the team that determined that the Earth was asymmetrical and "pear-shaped", based on data from Vanguard 1.

James E. Webb mentioned Bailie, Nancy Roman, and Eleanor C. Pressly in his 1961 commencement speech at George Washington University, as examples of women in the space program. In 1963, she was named one of the Ten Young Women of the Year by Mademoiselle magazine. Later in her career, she worked at Analytical Mechanics Associates in Maryland.

Selected publications and reports by Bailie 

 "A Determination of the coefficient J of the second harmonic in the Earth's gravitational potential from the orbit of the satellite 1958 β2" (1959, with Myron Lecar and John Sorenson)
"Lunar and Solar Perturbations on Satellite Orbits"" (1959, with E. Upton and Peter Musen)
 "Vanguard measurements give pear-shaped component of Earth's figure" (1959, with John A. O'Keefe and R. Kenneth Squires)
 "Ellipsoid Parameters from Satellite Data" (1959, with John A. O'Keefe, Nancy G. Roman, and Benjamin S. Yaplee)
 "Perturbations in Perigee Height of Vanguard I" (1960, with Peter Musen and Robert W. Bryant)
 "Osculating Elements Derived from the Modified Hansen Theory for the Motion of an Artificial Satellite" (1961)
 "An Analytical representation of Musen's theory of artificial satellites in terms of the orbital true longitude" (1963, with David Fisher)
 "On the motion of a 24-hour satellite" (1963, with Peter Musen)
 "Modifications of the Goddard Minimum Variance Program for the Processing of Real Data" (1964, with S. Pine, H. Wolf, and J. Mohan)
 "Development of the Lunar and Solar Perturbations in the Motion of an Artificial Satellite" (1965, with Peter Musen and E. Upton)
 "Adaptive Filtering" (1967, with Andrew H. Jazwinski)
"A set of uniform variational parameters for space trajectory analysis" (1967, with S. Pines and H. Wolf)
"Suboptimal Filtering" (1968, with Andrew H. Jazwinski, Stanley F. Schmidt, and Norman Levine)

Personal life 
Ann Eckels married accountant William J. Bailie in 1959. They had three children. Her husband died in 2009.

References 

1935 births
American women mathematicians
Middlebury College alumni
Goddard Space Flight Center people
Women in space
People from Laconia, New Hampshire
Living people
21st-century American women